Mark Jordan (born June 29, 1969), better known by his stage name DJ Pooh, is an American record producer, rapper, actor, voice actor, screenwriter and film director who has produced albums for many rappers such as King Tee,Snoop Dogg, Ice Cube, and 2Pac.

Biography 
Most known for his acting role as "Red" in the first Friday movie with Ice Cube, DJ Pooh co-wrote Friday and helped with character development. As a legendary record producer and mixing engineer, DJ Pooh has produced albums for 2Pac, Ice Cube, Del tha Funkee Homosapien, LL Cool J, Yo-Yo, Tha Dogg Pound, King T and many more. In 1986–1987, DJ Pooh  provided production for LL Cool J's second album, Bigger and Deffer. The album was certified double-platinum. He also produced 2Pac's All Eyez on Me in 1995. The album is certified diamond. He provided the bulk of the production for Snoop Dogg's second album, Tha Doggfather, in 1996. The album is certified double-platinum. DJ Pooh began in film by producing the drive-by shooting sequence in the 1991 film, Boyz n the Hood. He plays all three "Mack" characters in the video for the Ice Cube song "Who's the Mack?" from AmeriKKKa's Most Wanted. He has also written, produced and directed his own films, which include the 2000 film 3 Strikes and 2001's The Wash, which stars Dr. Dre and Snoop Dogg. DJ Pooh has been credited as co-producer and writer to the successful game Grand Theft Auto: San Andreas. He was a creative consultant on Grand Theft Auto V and is also a co-writer of the online version, making several cameo appearances, in addition to being a DJ on the radio station "West Coast Classics" within the game. DJ Pooh also appeared in 3 episodes of The Boondocks.

Discography

Studio albums

Filmography 
Friday – Red, co-writer
Next Friday - Himself (uncredited)
3 Strikes – Trick Turner / Taxi Driver, director and writer
The Wash – Slim, director, producer and writer
Grand Theft Auto: San Andreas – co-producer & writer
The Boondocks – Mudpie / Speaker #2 / Crowd Member / Laughing Funeral Attendee (voice only)
Freaknik: The Musical – Doela Man (voice only)
Grand Theft Auto V – creative consultant, DJ on West Coast Classics radio station
Grand Theft Auto Online – cameo as himself, also writer
Grow House – director and writer

References

External links 

DJ Pooh on Myspace

1969 births
Living people
21st-century American rappers
African-American film producers
African-American male actors
African-American screenwriters
American hip hop record producers
American male film actors
American male screenwriters
Film producers from California
G-funk artists
Hip hop record producers
Rappers from Los Angeles
Record producers from California
Screenwriters from California
Mixing engineers
20th-century African-American male singers
21st-century African-American musicians
African-American male writers